The Schutz American School is an independent, coeducational day school which offers an educational program from prekindergarten (Early Childhood Program) through grade 12 for students of all nationalities. The school is located in Alexandria, Egypt. It is the oldest American school in Africa, founded in 1924. The school year comprises two semesters extending from late August through mid-June.

Organization
The school is governed by a 13-member self-perpetuating School Board, serving renewable 3-year terms.

Curriculum
The curriculum is that of U.S. general academic and college-preparatory public schools. The school's testing program includes PSAT, SAT, Advanced Placement and other College Board tests and MAP tests. Instruction is in English. French is taught as a foreign language beginning in grade 6, and Arabic is taught as both a native and foreign language beginning in kindergarten. Once students are in grade 6, they have a choice to continue Arabic or to enroll in French.  The school is accredited by the New England Association of Schools and Colleges and the European Council of International Schools.

Faculty
In the 2014–15 school year, there are 63 full-time and 2 part-time faculty members. The administrative team is composed of a Head of School, Assistant Head of School, Principal (Prek3–Grade 12), and Assistant Principal/Curriculum Coordinator.

Enrollment
At the beginning of the 2014–15 school year, enrollment was 327 (PK3–grade 5: 199; grades 6–12: 128). The student body represents about 20 or more different countries. The average class size is 18 students.

Facilities
The school is located on two adjoining campuses, Pattee Campus and Schutz Campus. Walters Hall and the Villa are found on Pattee Campus, while Roy, Meloy, and Lorimer Halls are on the Schutz campuses. Athletic facilities include lit courts for tennis, basketball and volleyball, a swimming pool, and a gymnasium/weight room. Other facilities include an auditorium with theater capabilities that seats 200 with acoustical sound panels and choral risers, 2 conference rooms, a large multipurpose room, 2 libraries, 2 computer laboratories, an art center (including two art rooms, a kiln/pottery workshop, and a music room), a cafeteria, and a snack bar.

Pattee Campus

Walters Hall houses the Elementary School (pre-kindergarten through fifth grade classes) and the Elementary School office. It has 13 classrooms, a library, and also has facilities for art, technology, music, and English as a Second Language (ESL).

The Villa was part of the land purchase that included the soccer field and land on which Walters Hall is located. It houses Administration offices and a board/meeting room. The villa also is used for special events.

Schutz Campus
Roy Hall, the original Schutz building, houses the dining room/kitchen complex, staff housing facilities, and the central maintenance office.

Meloy Hall contains classrooms for Grade 6-12 students, the High School library, science labs, a computer lab, the Counselor/Psychologist office, and the High School office.

Lorimer Hall contains a large auditorium and additional Middle School classrooms. The auditorium can accommodate all of the 7–12 students, and is used for plays, music programs, assemblies, school dances, PTA programs, board of trustees meetings, staff meetings. On weekends serves as an interdenominational Christian place of worship on Sundays. The auditorium is equipped with a sound system, and is air conditioned (as are all other indoor classroom spaces and offices).

Sports facilities
The school has four main sports facilities, all located on the Schutz campus. They include:

 A swimming pool for P.E. and for student and staff use outside the school day
 An outdoor basketball court which can also be used for volleyball
 A covered court which can be used for tennis, volleyball, and basketball
 A soccer field used for soccer, a playground, and P.E. classes, all purpose field/playground for elementary students, as well as a soccer field for the school soccer teams. It also serves as a baseball field, ultimate-Frisbee court, golf pitching area, and exercise area for staff during and after school hours

All of the sports facilities are available for student's use until 5:00 p.m. on school days, and from 1:00 to 5:00 p.m. on weekends.

Cafeteria/canteen
Fourth through 12th grade students can eat in the cafeteria located in Roy Hall or at the canteen. Both the canteen and the cafeteria have a variety of choices from which to choose. PK through 2nd grade students eat in the lower level of Walters Hall. Grades 3 through 6 eat outdoors near Walters Hall.

Activities
Sports and club offerings vary from year to year depending on student interest and participation.

The school competes in the International Schools Activities Conference (ISAC) and the Middle East Triangle Sports Conference (METS). The ISAC has been in existence since 1993, with Schutz American School being a charter member along with current members New Cairo British International School, Modern English School of Cairo, Al Nahda National School - Abu Dhabi, Universal American School - Kuwait, and American Community School - Beirut. Currently in the METS as a trial member, Schutz joins international schools from Lebanon, Jordan, Egypt, Turkey, the West Bank, and Bahrain. Schutz was once a member of the Eastern Mediterranean Activities Conference (EMAC), but left in 2011 when that conference folded.

Sports offered include Volleyball, Basketball, Football, Swimming, Badminton, Tennis, Track and Field with other sports offered on student demand. There are teams for both boys and girls, from grades 4-5 through middle school, as well as junior varsity and varsity levels.

Schutz also offers non-athletic activities and organizations as well for its students, including Student Council, Model United Nations, National Honor Society, Academic Games, Community Service, school drama productions, an annual talent show, and the annual ISAC Choir Festival.

External links

 Schutz American School website

Educational institutions established in 1924
1924 establishments in Egypt
American international schools in Egypt
Private schools in Alexandria
International schools in Alexandria